Tullyniskan is a civil parish in Northern Ireland, in the traditional county of County Tyrone, Ireland.

There are 27 townlands in Tullyniskan.

List of townlands

A 

 Achadh Cinn Saileach 
 Aghakinsallagh Glebe

B 

 Baile Meadhonach 
 Ballymenagh
 Blacktown,
 Bloomhill Demesne,

C 

 Carn
 Creenagh 
 Críonach
 Cuileann 
 Cullion
 Curran

D 

 Derry 
 Derrywinnin Glebe 
 Doire 
 Doire Mhaine 
 DorasEdendork

F 

 Farlough 
 Fuar-loch

G 

 Gleann Con 
 Glencon
 Gort Gonaidh 
 Gort na Sceach 
 Gortgonis 
 Gortin
 Gortnaskea 
 Guirtin

M 

 Min na bhFiach 
 Mineveigh
 Mullach Margaidh
 Mullaghmarget

Q 

 Quintinmanus

S 

 Seiseadhach 
 Sessia
 Stucan 
 Stughan

W 

 Whitetown
 Woodhill

See also
List of civil parishes of County Tyrone
List of townlands in County Tyrone

References

Civil parishes of County Tyrone